Millstone is a borough in Somerset County, in the U.S. state of New Jersey. The borough was originally known as Somerset Courthouse and was the county seat. As of the 2020 United States census, the borough's population was 448, an increase of 30 (+7.2%) from the 2010 census count of 418, which in turn reflected an increase of 8 (+2.0%) from the 410 counted at the 2000 census.

Millstone was incorporated as a borough by an act of the New Jersey Legislature on May 14, 1894, from portions of Hillsborough Township, based on the results of a referendum held that day. The borough was reincorporated on March 12, 1928. The borough was named for the Millstone River (a major tributary of the Raritan River), whose name derives from an incident in which a millstone was dropped into it.

A historic district in Millstone, comprising 58 buildings, was added to the National Register of Historic Places in 1976. The borough possesses a military significance for 1700–1749, 1750–1799, 1850–1874.

New Jersey Monthly magazine ranked Millstone as its 7th best place to live in its 2008 rankings of the "Best Places To Live" in New Jersey.

History

Millstone, then called Somerset Courthouse, was the county seat of Somerset County from 1738 until the British burned it to the ground in 1779 during the American Revolutionary War. After the victory at Princeton on January 3, 1777, General George Washington headquartered at the Van Doren house, while the army camped nearby that night. The next day, they marched to Pluckemin on the way to their winter encampment at Morristown.

Millstone was briefly connected to the Pennsylvania Railroad when the Mercer and Somerset Railway was extended to the town in the 1870s and connected via a bridge across the Millstone River to the Pennsylvania Railroad's Millstone and New Brunswick Railroad, but that arrangement did not last into the 1880s. Remnants of the railroad bridge can still be seen.

Geography
According to the United States Census Bureau, the borough had a total area of 0.70 square miles (1.82 km2), including 0.68 square miles (1.76 km2) of land and 0.02 square miles (0.05 km2) of water (2.86%).

The borough borders Franklin Township and Hillsborough Township.

Ecology
According to the A. W. Kuchler U.S. potential natural vegetation types, Millstone, New Jersey would have an Appalachian Oak (104) vegetation type with an Eastern Hardwood Forest (25) vegetation form.

Demographics

2010 census

The Census Bureau's 2006–2010 American Community Survey showed that (in 2010 inflation-adjusted dollars) median household income was $97,500 (with a margin of error of +/− $18,039) and the median family income was $102,708 (+/− $20,734). Males had a median income of $73,250 (+/− $8,715) versus $50,625 (+/− $15,872) for females. The per capita income for the borough was $37,678 (+/− $5,017). About none of families and 0.5% of the population were below the poverty line, including none of those under age 18 and 3.0% of those age 65 or over.

2000 census
As of the 2000 United States census there were 410 people, 169 households, and 126 families residing in the borough. The population density was 547.1 people per square mile (211.1/km2). There were 173 housing units at an average density of 230.9 per square mile (89.1/km2). The racial makeup of the borough was 97.56% White, 0.98% African American, 0.98% Asian, and 0.49% from two or more races. Hispanic or Latino of any race were 3.17% of the population.

There were 169 households, out of which 25.4% had children under the age of 18 living with them, 59.8% were married couples living together, 9.5% had a female householder with no husband present, and 24.9% were non-families. 18.9% of all households were made up of individuals, and 8.9% had someone living alone who was 65 years of age or older. The average household size was 2.43 and the average family size was 2.79.

In the borough the population was spread out, with 19.3% under the age of 18, 4.1% from 18 to 24, 25.4% from 25 to 44, 34.1% from 45 to 64, and 17.1% who were 65 years of age or older. The median age was 46 years. For every 100 females, there were 99.0 males. For every 100 females age 18 and over, there were 91.3 males.

The median income for a household in the borough was $76,353, and the median income for a family was $83,118. Males had a median income of $60,156 versus $36,406 for females. The per capita income for the borough was $30,694. About 3.1% of families and 4.6% of the population were below the poverty line, including 6.4% of those under age 18 and 7.3% of those age 65 or over.

Government

Local government
Millstone is governed under the Borough form of New Jersey municipal government, which is used in 218 municipalities (of the 564) statewide, making it the most common form of government in New Jersey. The governing body is comprised of the Mayor and the Borough Council, with all positions elected at-large on a partisan basis as part of the November general election. The Mayor is elected directly by the voters to a four-year term of office. The Borough Council is comprised of six members elected to serve three-year terms on a staggered basis, with two seats coming up for election each year in a three-year cycle. The Borough form of government used by Millstone is a "weak mayor / strong council" government in which council members act as the legislative body with the mayor presiding at meetings and voting only in the event of a tie. The mayor can veto ordinances subject to an override by a two-thirds majority vote of the council. The mayor makes committee and liaison assignments for council members, and most appointments are made by the mayor with the advice and consent of the council.

, the Mayor of Millstone Borough is Democrat Raymond Heck, whose term of office ends December 31, 2022. Members of the Millstone Borough Council are Council President Mandy Coppola (D, 2022), Robert Galli (I, 2024), Alan Kidd (R, 2023), Karin Kidd (2023), Kristen Ross (R, 2022) and Johnathan Stashek (D, 2024).

In January 2019, the Borough Council selected Vincent Biviano from three candidates nominated by the Republican municipal committee to fill the seat expiring in December 2021 that had been won, but never filled, by Merry Emmich.

Federal, state, and county representation
Millstone is located in the 12th Congressional District and is part of New Jersey's 16th state legislative district 

 

Somerset County is governed by a five-member Board of County Commissioners, whose members are elected at-large to three-year terms of office on a staggered basis, with one or two seats coming up for election each year. At an annual reorganization meeting held on the first Friday of January, the board selects a Director and Deputy Director from among its members. , Somerset County's County Commissioners are
Director Shanel Robinson (D, Franklin Township, term as commissioner ends December 31, 2024; term as director ends 2022),
Deputy Director Melonie Marano (D, Green Brook Township, term as commissioner and as deputy director ends 2022),
Paul Drake (D, Hillsborough Township, 2023),
Douglas Singleterry (D, North Plainfield, 2023) and 
Sara Sooy (D, Basking Ridge in Bernards Township, 2024).
Pursuant to Article VII Section II of the New Jersey State Constitution, each county in New Jersey is required to have three elected administrative officials known as constitutional officers. These officers are the County Clerk and County Surrogate (both elected for five-year terms of office) and the County Sheriff (elected for a three-year term). Constitutional officers, elected on a countywide basis are 
County Clerk Steve Peter (D, Somerville, 2022),
Sheriff Darrin Russo (D, Franklin Township, 2022) and 
Surrogate Bernice "Tina" Jalloh (D, Franklin Township, 2025)

Politics
As of March 23, 2011, there were a total of 309 registered voters in Millstone, of which 107 (34.6% vs. 26.0% countywide) were registered as Democrats, 85 (27.5% vs. 25.7%) were registered as Republicans and 117 (37.9% vs. 48.2%) were registered as Unaffiliated. There were no voters registered to other parties. Among the borough's 2010 Census population, 73.9% (vs. 60.4% in Somerset County) were registered to vote, including 96.9% of those ages 18 and over (vs. 80.4% countywide).

In the 2012 presidential election, Republican Mitt Romney received 49.8% of the vote (119 cast), ahead of Democrat Barack Obama with 49.4% (118 votes), and other candidates with 0.8% (2 votes), among the 240 ballots cast by the borough's 325 registered voters (1 ballot was spoiled), for a turnout of 73.8%. In the 2008 presidential election, Republican John McCain received 143 votes (57.0% vs. 46.1% countywide), ahead of Democrat Barack Obama with 104 votes (41.4% vs. 52.1%) and other candidates with 2 votes (0.8% vs. 1.1%), among the 251 ballots cast by the borough's 309 registered voters, for a turnout of 81.2% (vs. 78.7% in Somerset County). In the 2004 presidential election, Republican George W. Bush received 130 votes (50.6% vs. 51.5% countywide), ahead of Democrat John Kerry with 123 votes (47.9% vs. 47.2%) and other candidates with 2 votes (0.8% vs. 0.9%), among the 257 ballots cast by the borough's 304 registered voters, for a turnout of 84.5% (vs. 81.7% in the whole county).

In the 2013 gubernatorial election, Republican Chris Christie received 61.0% of the vote (97 cast), ahead of Democrat Barbara Buono with 35.2% (56 votes), and other candidates with 3.8% (6 votes), among the 159 ballots cast by the borough's 320 registered voters for a turnout of 49.7%. In the 2009 gubernatorial election, Republican Chris Christie received 100 votes (54.6% vs. 55.8% countywide), ahead of Democrat Jon Corzine with 62 votes (33.9% vs. 34.1%), Independent Chris Daggett with 18 votes (9.8% vs. 8.7%) and other candidates with 1 votes (0.5% vs. 0.7%), among the 183 ballots cast by the borough's 303 registered voters, yielding a 60.4% turnout (vs. 52.5% in the county).

Education

Several classical schools operated in the Millstone area. Queens College was relocated to Millstone in 1780 during the war. In 1814, a two-story building called the Academy was established as a co-ed public school on the lot owned by Daniel Disborough. In 1860, the school was relocated to a newly constructed building later to be known as the Millstone Borough Schoolhouse, which then operated until 1940, after which it was known as Millstone Borough Hall.   Another classical school focusing on Latin started in 1826 at the home of Dominie Zabriskie. Joseph P. Bradley, who would later become a U.S. Supreme Court Justice, also taught at a classical school in Millstone after graduating at Rutgers in 1836 and before attending law school where he was barred in 1839.

There are no public schools currently operating in Millstone Borough; students attend public school in the Hillsborough Township School District, in Hillsborough Township as part of a sending/receiving relationship. As of the 2018–2019 school year, the district, comprised of nine schools, had an enrollment of 7,457 students and 645.4 classroom teachers (on an FTE basis), for a student–teacher ratio of 11.6:1.

Transportation

No Interstate, U.S. or state highways directly serve Millstone. The most prominent roads in the borough are County Route 514 and County Route 533.

Notable people 

People who were born in, residents of, or otherwise closely associated with Millstone include:
 Frederick Theodore Frelinghuysen (1817–1885), United States Senator representing New Jersey and a United States Secretary of State under Chester A. Arthur
 Ferdinand Schureman Schenck (1790–1860), represented New Jersey in the United States House of Representatives from 1833–1837
 Charles Titus (1838–1921), Union Army soldier who was awarded a Medal of Honor for his actions in the Civil War

See also 
 Millstone Historic District

References

External links 

 Millstone Borough website
 Hillsborough Township School District
 
 School Data for the Hillsborough Township School District, National Center for Education Statistics

 
1894 establishments in New Jersey
Borough form of New Jersey government
Boroughs in Somerset County, New Jersey
Historic districts on the National Register of Historic Places in New Jersey
New Jersey District Factor Group none
Populated places established in 1894